= Vechevoral =

A vechevoral is a type of bladed chopping weapon of Indian origin. The blade is sickle-shaped and has a concave cutting edge.
